The grey-throated tit-flycatcher (Myioparus griseigularis) is a species of bird in the family Muscicapidae.
It is found in Angola, Cameroon, Central African Republic, Republic of the Congo, Democratic Republic of the Congo, Ivory Coast, Equatorial Guinea, Gabon, Ghana, Liberia, Nigeria, Sierra Leone, Tanzania, and Uganda.
Its natural habitat is subtropical or tropical moist lowland forests.

References

grey-throated tit-flycatcher
Birds of Central Africa
Birds of West Africa
grey-throated tit-flycatcher
Taxonomy articles created by Polbot
Taxobox binomials not recognized by IUCN